Adhiparasakthi Charitable, Medical, Educational and Cultural Trust (ACMEC) is a charitable organization in Tamil Nadu, India.  It was founded in 1978 in Melmaruvathur by Bangaru Adigalar; it funds colleges and a hospital.

References

Tamil society
Charities based in India
Organizations established in 1978
1978 establishments in Tamil Nadu